Bas-Fleuve District was a district located in the Kongo Central province, in the Democratic Republic of the Congo. 
It included the Tshela, Lukula and Seke-Banza territories.

References

Districts of Kongo Central